Nursing a Viper is a 1909 American silent short film by pioneer director D. W. Griffith. A paper print of the film survives in the Library of Congress.

Cast
Arthur V. Johnson as The Husband
Marion Leonard as The Wife
Frank Powell as The Viper
Frank Evans as Man in Mob
Ruth Hart as Woman
James Kirkwood as Man in Mob
Florence Lawrence  
Henry Lehrman as Man in Mob
Owen Moore as Fleeing Aristocrat
George Nichols as Man in Mob
Anthony O'Sullivan as Man in Mob
Billy Quirk as Fleeing Aristocrat
Gertrude Robinson as Fleeing Aristocrat
Mack Sennett as Man in Mob
Mabel Trunnelle as Victimized Woman

See also
D. W. Griffith filmography

References

External links

Nursing a Viper; allrovi/synopsis

1909 films
American silent short films
Films directed by D. W. Griffith
American black-and-white films
Films with screenplays by Frank E. Woods
1900s American films